Pommes Anna, or Anna potatoes, is a classic French dish of sliced, layered potatoes cooked in a very large amount of melted butter.

The recipe calls for firm-fleshed potatoes and butter only. Potatoes are peeled and sliced very thin. The slices, salted and peppered, are layered into a pan (see below), generously doused with clarified butter, and baked/fried until they form a cake. Then the cake is flipped every ten minutes until the outside is golden and crisp. It is then cut in wedges and served immediately on a hot plate, usually accompanying roasted meats.

A special double baking dish made of copper called la cocotte à pommes Anna is still manufactured in France for the cooking of this dish. It consists of upper and lower halves which fit into each other so that the whole vessel with its contents can be inverted during cooking.

History
The dish is generally credited with having been created during the time of Napoleon III by the chef Adolphe Dugléré, a pupil of Carême, when Dugléré was head chef at the Café Anglais, the leading Paris restaurant of the 19th century, where he reputedly named the dish for one of the grandes cocottes of the period. There is disagreement about which beauty the dish was named after: the actress Dame Judic (real name: Anna Damiens), or Anna Deslions.

See also
 List of foods named after people

References 

French cuisine
Potato dishes
Baked foods